Dezső Szabó is the name of:

 Dezső Szabó (writer) (1879–1945), Hungarian writer
 Dezső Szabó (athlete) (born 1967), Hungarian decathlete